Carla L. Benson is an American vocalist known for her recorded background vocals.

Biography

Early years
Carla L. Benson grew up in South Jersey with her mother and two brothers. Eventually, her family grew to include a stepfather and younger sister.

Benson studied dance at Sidney King School of Dance in Camden from ages 4–12. She developed her love of a great story and a beautiful melodic line through her mother's love of great jazz vocalists, most notably Sarah Vaughan, Nancy Wilson, Gloria Lynn, Aretha Franklin and a group called Patti LaBelle and the BlueBelles.

She attended Pyne Point Junior High School where she joined the Walter Young Choral Ensemble. in 1968, they earned an appearance on the Ted Mack Amateur Hour in New York City. She began private voice lessons in her eighth grade year at the insistence of her mother, from the man who would become her lifelong mentor and father figure/friend: Dr. James Mumford, Professor Emeritus of Bloomington, Indiana. Two years later she entered Camden High School.

She entered Glassboro State College, later named Rowan University, immediately after graduation as a Music Education Major. In her freshman year, she was invited to audition for a newly formed record company called Philadelphia International Records by her first cousin Barbara Ingram, who called to ask if she knew of another girl who could sing and, together, they could form a group.

Early career
Benson began her professional career singing with her cousin Barbara, who died unexpectedly in 1994, and Evette L. Benton, her best friend from childhood and later college roommate. After auditioning for Thom Bell they became the in-house background vocalists for Philadelphia International Records for over 10 years. They vigorously resisted any group name, but eventually were named "The Sweethearts of Sigma" for the famous Sigma Sound Studios where they did the majority of their work, by mix master Tom Moulton.

They never signed an exclusive contract, making them were free to work as independent contractors for whomever they chose. As a result, they appeared on many projects outside the Philadelphia International stables. They can be heard on hundreds of hits, including Billy Paul's "Me and Mrs. Jones", The Spinners' "I'll Be Around", McFadden and Whitehead's "Ain't No Stoppin' Us Now", Evelyn "Champagne" King's "Shame", Patti LaBelle's "New Attitude" and "If Only You Knew", Lou Rawls' "You'll Never Find Another Love Like Mine" and Patti LaBelle and Michael McDonald's "On My Own" to name a few. 

During the Disco era, The Sweethearts were heavily sought after for their vocals. Precluded by confidentiality agreements from revealing actual artists and title songs, the Sweethearts were the actual vocalists for several major disco hits as well as the named and unnamed background vocalists for studio orchestras MFSB, The Salsoul Orchestra, The Original Ritchie Family, and John Davis' Monster Orchestra. They provided background vocals for Grace Jones, The Trammps, the Village People, Gloria Gaynor, Loleatta Holloway, France Joli,  and hundreds of other successful disco acts. After the runaway success of Saturday Night Fever, even John Travolta tried his hand at recording and insisted on the vocal assistance of the famed Sweethearts. (Credits at Discogs.com/CarlaL.Benson)

With the sudden decline of disco, the women were without work and decided to break up the group. Benson was approached to produce the annual fundraising event for The Dr. Charles Henderson Auxiliary, the only African American auxiliary of the Cooper University Hospital in her native Camden, New Jersey. She wrote and directed an ensemble cast, produced, and performed in her creation, which she named "Rhapsody in Black".  That year, the auxiliary exceeded its own expectations and was able to make its largest donation to the hospital in their history. That record still stands today.

Benson won lead roles in two productions of Ain't Misbehavin''' at The Riverfront Dinner Theater in Philadelphia, Pennsylvania.

Carla had been a long-time Patti LaBelle fan. The Sweethearts had previously recorded the background vocals for Ms. LaBelle's "If Only You Knew", "Love, Need, and Want", and a few others. In the mid-80s, when LaBelle wanted new background vocalists, she wondered if "The Girls" would be interested. The Sweethearts hadn't sung together for three years, but when this opportunity arose, they quickly came back together. For the first and only time in the Sweethearts' career, they toured and recorded exclusively with one artist, Patti LaBelle. It was her who renamed them "The Sweeties", giving the name which ultimately stuck. LaBelle fondly referred to Benson as "Sweetie Number One". It was during their tenure with LaBelle that they recorded the soundtrack for Beverly Hills Cop and did the popular video "Stir It Up". LaBelle received her first platinum album, Winner in You, on which the Sweeties performed. She graciously orchestrated the moment when the Sweeties received their platinum albums during an on-air interview on the popular television show People Are Talking with Richard Bey in 1987.

During her down times off the road, Carla Benson worked as a substitute teacher for the Camden School system, where her love of inner-city teenagers began to take root and grow.

On her own
After 5 years on the road, Benson decided to hang up her traveling shoes and secured an aggressive, successful agent in the Atlantic City area, Andrea Kaufman. Under her direction in 1988, Benson caught the attention of several entertainment directors for Atlantic City casinos, and was eventually offered the opportunity to open in the main room of the Claridge Hotel and Casino in November of that same year. Patti LaBelle showed her support for Benson by attending and singing at the concert. The show was deemed a massive success and Benson spent the next two years performing exclusively at the Trump Casino's special events, and the Claridge Casino.

Wedding singer
When the casinos closed many of their lounges, Benson sang for over fifteen years with a busy, upscale wedding band, The Franklin Alison Orchestra, out of Princeton, New Jersey.

Tony Award-winning writer Joseph A. Walker (The River Niger) was hired to produce a series of musicals for Rutgers University. Under his direction, Benson starred in productions of Dreamgirls, The Amen Corner, Buddy Bolden and Raisin. Before his untimely death, he was writing another musical, especially for her, which he hoped to have produced on Broadway.

Walker's musical director, Tony Booker, was instrumental in Benson being signed to a five-year contract at the Kennedy Center for the Performing Arts in Washington, D.C., where she was featured in their annual production of Black Nativity, under the direction of the founder of the Duke Ellington School of Performing Arts, Mike Malone. She also had a lead role in a developing work written and directed by Tony Award-winning choreographer George Faison.
 
In 1996, Benson graduated at the top of her class from the Technical Institute of New Jersey, Pennsauken Campus as a certified paralegal. She began work as an executive legal secretary in arbitration for Judge Vogelson at the Hall of Justice in Camden. She laughingly refers to this time as proving to herself that she "is a musician".

In 1999, she graduated with a Bachelor of Arts degree in Vocal Music from Rowan University.

Benson worked as a Permanent Substitute at Camden High School.

Standing in the shadows
In 2000, Benson was approached by her friend, Allan Slutsky, to participate in a film that would highlight the studio musicians of Motown, who were called "The Funk Brothers".  Being a studio musician herself, this project held a particular appeal for her. Slutsky knew of Benson's professional recording career and hired her to be section leader for the background vocals for the film. Benson hired her cousin Johnny Ingram to go with her, and they traveled with her brother Keith, associate producer for the film, to Detroit, Michigan for two weeks of rehearsals and filming. She worked with artists like Gerald LeVert, whose father she'd previously worked with as a member of the O'Jays; Chaka Khan; Bootsy Collins; Ben Harper; Joan Osborne; Tom Scott; and the Funk Brothers themselves. The project, called Standing in the Shadows of Motown, became an award-winning documentary, and went on to win three Grammy Awards.

Encouraged by her mother to return to music, Benson toured the world with the infamous Funk Brothers for about three years. Due to the advanced ages of the Funk Brothers, the touring schedule was very sporadic, leaving big chunks of downtime.
 
Also during this time, writer John A. Jackson approached Benson for an interview in his upcoming book, A House on Fire, the Rise and Fall of Philadelphia Soul, which was released in 2005.  Benson is credited with the opening quote and is quoted extensively throughout this rendering, in book form, of one man's view of life at Philadelphia International Records.

Return to teaching

In 2001, Dr. Stephanie Branch offered her a position as a music teacher at the Charles E. Brimm Medical Arts High School in Camden. Benson and her students thrived in the classroom and no one was more surprised by this "fit" than Benson. She said, "My children need to know more than do-re-mi. They need to know they are valuable. They need to know life skills such as the importance of voting and the absolute necessity of being able to read and they must, must reconnect with their dreams and goals. I can help them do all of that, through MUSIC as I teach it".

Dr. Branch thought it was a plus to have a music teacher who was also a performing musician, as long as her absences were not too long in duration or frequency. After two years, Dr. Branch left to further her career. The interim powers that remained at Brimm Medical Arts did not have Dr. Branch's vision or understanding of a touring musician and forced Benson out. She used the time to complete the quest she'd begun so many years ago.  She attended classes at the Women's Opportunity Resource Center in Philadelphia to complete her business plan, and her "Awakenings, Inc." was born.

Currently

Benson continues to perform and has recently released two new original projects, a single called "Welcome" and a full CD entitled You Should Be Here. In November 2014, she directed and produced a Christmas video for Youtube with an all Camden, New Jersey cast, entitled "Voices of Camden, Featuring Carla Benson".

She continues to seek funding for her "Awakenings" after-school program aimed at inner-city, at-risk high school youth. Her dream is to return to the stage on a more consistent basis to fund the program herself.

Documentary

Carla appears in the documentary "Standing in the Shadows of Motown", written by Allan Slutsky. This film won three Grammy Awards.

References

"Carla Benson Ringleader on the Educational CyberPlayGround"
"Carla Benson's Personal Message to Children"
"K-12 Standing in the Shadows of Motown WebQuest"
"Carla Benson Collects Children's Music for the National Children's Folksong Repository"
An interview with Carla Benson at Soul Express in December 2014
allmusic.com/CarlaLBenson/credits
discogs.com/CarlaLBenson/creditsStanding in the Shadows of Motown DVDA House on Fire'' by John A. Jackson
New York Post article "Backing Up is Hard to Do" by Jan Hoffman, 1988

Living people
American women singers
Musicians from Camden, New Jersey
Year of birth missing (living people)
Rowan University alumni
21st-century American women